Jerome "Jah Jerry" Haynes OD (11 August 1921 – 13 August 2007) was a Jamaican guitarist and former member of The Skatalites.

Haynes was born in Trench Pen, presently known as Trench Town, the cultural capital of Jamaica, in 1921. He learned to play guitar from early years by his father and then by Ernest Ranglin. In 1949 he played with the Jocelyn Trott Orchestra in Montego Bay.

This prepared him for his sojourn into organized playing when he hit the hotel circuit playing with the Jocelyn Trott Orchestra in Montego Bay, in 1949. In the mid-1950s he freelanced with several other bands (including saxophonist Val Bennett's jazz band) until he joined the Arkland "Drumbago" Parks Studio Band. His upward "stumming" of the guitar became the signature style in the Boogie Shuffle/Ska

In 1959 Haynes worked with Prince Buster and played guitar in many sessions. In 1961, he was contracted exclusively to Coxsone Dodd, though he played for other producers, such as Duke Reid, King Edwards the Giant and Lyndon Pottinger. In 1964 he was one of The Skatalites founders and played with them until 1965. He was featured on Rico Rodriguez' That Man Is Forward album. Two years later, he joined the reformed Skatalites at the Reggae Sunsplash festival.

Haynes left the Skatalites in 1986 and lived in relative anonymity in Jones Town.

Jah Jerry, O.D, as a member of the Skatalites, was one of the first twelve inductees in the Jamaica Music Hall of Fame sponsored by the Jamaica Association of Vintage Artists and Affiliates in 2008. In 2010, he was honored by the Jamaican Government on National Heroes Day and was posthumously awarded the "Order of Distinction" at King's House for his contribution to the development of Jamaican music. Jah Jerry was also a songwriter and a pioneer musician who helped create Jamaica's first indigenous music. He was a legendary guitarist who added jazz chords to the music and rapidly and repeatedly shifted these chords which was unheard of during that time.

After the breakup of the Skatalites, Jah Jerry had continued working as a session musician. He played on the album, Top Secret, with Tommy McCook and Supersonics in the 1960s.  He recorded several hit songs in the 1970s, including "Black Star Liner" by Fred Locks, "The Gorgon" by Cornell Campbell and "Satta MassaGana" by the Abyssinians. When the original Skatalites reunited in the 1980s, minus Don Drummond (deceased 1969), Jah Jerry played with the band at Reggae Sunsplash in Jamaica (1983) and in England (1984). They recorded three albums: Return of the Big Guns, Stretching Out and Rolling Steady.  He also toured with the band in the United States and performed in New York at the Village Gate and SOB. While living in New York,  Jah Jerry did session works for Sir Clement Dodd at his studio in Brooklyn. Dodd was a legendary producer and owner of the Studio One in Jamaica.  Jah Jerry retired in the year 2000, his career spanning over 50 years which covered various musical genre:  Mento; Boggie/Shuffle; SKA; Rock Steady and Reggae. He recorded hundreds of songs during his musical tenure and worked with the cream of Jamaican producers and musicians. He was a member of the following bands: Prince Buster's All Stars, Drumbago Allstars, Duke Reid Group, Beverly's Allstars, King Edwards, various Studio One outfits, and of course the great Skatalites. The Skatalites were the musicians instrumental in the developing the Ska beat as well as the Rock Steady and Reggae beat.

He played on a host of vintage and classic songs, such as "Be Still", "Oh Carolina", "Simmer Down", "Carry Go Bring Come", "One love", "Humpty Dumpty", "Wash, Wash", "Blazing Fire", "Man in the Street", "Eastern Standard Time", "Rough and Tough", just to name a few. He played on the first-ever recording sessions for many Jamaican artists who became famous. These artists included Bob Marley and the Wailers, Jimmy Cliff, Desmond Dekker, Millie Small, Prince Buster, Alton Ellis, Delroy Wilson, Toots and the Maytals, Derrick Morgan, Justin Hinds and the Dominoes and Stranger Cole.

References

External links
 Biography at Guardian
 Biography at Vintage Boss
 Biography at FindArticles.com
 Reggae Heritage, Jamaica's Music Culture & Politics, Lou Gooden,P.267

1921 births
2007 deaths
Musicians from Kingston, Jamaica
The Skatalites members
Ska guitarists
Jamaican Rastafarians
Recipients of the Order of Distinction
20th-century guitarists